Guida is a given name and surname. Of Italian origin, it is the patronymic or plural form of Guido. It can also mean "guide" in longer names such as Cacciaguida.

People with the surname 
 Robert "Bob" J. Giuda (born 1952), New Hampshire politician
 Clay Guida (born 1981), American mixed martial artist
 Frank Guida (1922–2007), Sicilian-American composer and music producer
 George Guida (1924–2015), American sprinter
 Gloria Guida (born 1955), Italian actress and model
 Jason Guida (born 1977), American mixed martial artist
 Marco Guida (born 1981), Italian football referee
 Maria Guida (born 1966), Italian long-distance runner
 Tony Guida (born 1941), New York-based local television and radio personality
 Viviano Guida (born 1955), retired Italian professional football player
 Wandisa Guida (born 1935), Italian former film, stage and television actress

People with the given name 
 Guida Diehl (1868–1961), German teacher and founder of Neulandbund, a Nazi organisation for women
 Guida Maria (1950–2018), Portuguese actress

See also 
 George Guida, Sr. House, a historic U.S. home in Florida

References 

Italian-language surnames